The  is a Tokyu skyscraper and retail complex completed in 2012 and located in the Shibuya shopping district of Tokyo, Japan.

The Hikarie is 183 meters tall. As of November 2013, it was tied for being the 52nd tallest skyscraper in Japan and 40th tallest building in Tokyo.

The Hikarie features extensive use of LED lighting and displays and combines shopping/dining/entertainment in similar ways to the Roppongi Hills project. Its profile and significance are partially due to being immediately proximate to Shibuya Station, to which it is connected by both a 2nd-floor sky-walk and underground walkway.

Although it does not yet have the same cultural significance as the 109 Building, it is a prime retail and office destination. The public access floors (floors 1 - 11) are marked by glass-walling, allowing for views across Shibuya and Tokyo.

Shibuya Hikarie features retail sales and event space up to floor 11, at which point access is controlled to the theatre (11-16) and private office space (17-34). Clients include KDDI and a number of headquarters for media companies.

Pronunciation
Although the -rie ending is a feminine French ending correctly pronounced  (approximately ), and the use of French or faux French is common in Japanese lady's fashion, in this case the name of the building has four syllables, from  meaning "towards the light". The name was selected with the intention of evoking progressive thinking of Shibuya's future.

Media coverage
The Hikarie has been featured by the national tourism agency and in popular culture and media. Tokyo Fashion Week is headquartered in this building, resulting in significant positive coverage in the domestic press. Foreign media have covered novel retail strategies, including the use of "themed floors" rather than the traditional retail division of men's fashion or women's sportwear.

References

Skyscraper office buildings in Tokyo
Retail buildings in Tokyo
Buildings and structures completed in 2012